Krishnapatnam or Kistnapatam is a port town in Muthukur mandal of Nellore district in Andhra Pradesh, India.

Demographics 

The total 
population constitute,  males,  females and 
 children, in the age group of 0–6 years. The average literacy rate stands at 
65.22% with  literates, significantly lower than the national average of 73.00%.

Location 
Hinterland
Vast hinterland covering Southern Andhra Pradesh, Districts of Rayalseema, North Tamil Nadu and Eastern Karnataka 
Being on Eastern Coast, supports LOOK EAST Exim Trade Policy

Power projects 
A 4000 MW UMPP with investment of Rs17,500 Crores is being constructed. Besides this UMPP, APGENCO set up a 1600 MW power station named as Sri Damodaram Sanjeevaiah Thermal Power Station at Krishnapatnam.

Smart City 
Nellore shall transform into a smart city with support from Confederation of Indian Industries CII as reported at The Hindu - CII to help Nellore become a smart city

References

External links 

 
 What are smart cities?

Towns in Nellore district
Port cities in India
Smart cities in India